Park Se-Young (born 3 October 1989) is a South Korean footballer who plays as a forward for Gimhae FC in the Korea National League.

External links 

1989 births
Living people
Association football forwards
South Korean footballers
Seongnam FC players
K League 1 players
Korea National League players